Events in the year 1811 in Art.

Works
Jean Auguste Dominique Ingres – Jupiter and Thetis
Georg Friedrich Kersting – Caspar David Friedrich in His Studio
Thomas Lawrence – Portrait of Benjamin West
Bertel Thorvaldsen – Procession of Alexander the Great

Births
January 2 – Uroš Knežević, Serbian painter (d. 1876)
March 20 – George Caleb Bingham, American realist artist (died 1879)
April 5 – Jules Dupré, French painter (died 1889)
May 11 – Prince Grigory Gagarin, Russian soldier and painter (died 1893)
May 15 – Katarina Ivanović, Serbian painter (died 1882)
July 28 – Charles West Cope, English genre painter (died 1890)
December 3 – Eduard Bendemann, German painter (died 1889)
Undated
Nam Gyewoo, Korean painter and government officer (died 1888)
Jakob Guttmann, Romanian-born Hungarian Jewish sculptor (died 1860)
Auguste Ottin, French sculptor (died 1890)
Pierre Étienne Rémillieux, French painter (died 1856)

Deaths
January 8 – Sir Francis Bourgeois, court painter to King George III of the United Kingdom (born 1753)
January 10 
 Luigi Frisoni, Italian painter (born 1760)
 Martin Ferdinand Quadal, Moravian-Austrian painter and engraver (born 1736)
January 12 – Félix Boisselier, French historical painter (born 1776)
January 21 – Nicolas Henri Joseph de Fassin, Belgian landscape painter (born 1728)
February 19 – Joaquín Inza y Ainsa, Spanish Baroque painter (born 1736)
March 1 – Jean-Simon Berthélemy, French history painter (born 1743)
March 4 – Gilles-Louis Chrétien, French musician and creator of the physionotrace used for portraits (born 1754)
April 28 – Johann Baptist Drechsler, Austrian painter of flowers (born 1766)
May 1 – John Smart, English painter of portrait miniatures (born 1740)
July 16 – Joseph Barber, English landscape painter and art teacher (born 1757)
July 28 – Abraham Abramson, Prussian coiner and medallist (born 1752/1754)
September 16 – Jacob Adam, Austrian copper etcher (born 1748)
September 30 – Antoine Raspal, French painter (born 1738)
October 5 – Adolf Ulrik Wertmüller, Swedish painter (born 1751)
October 15 – Sir Nathaniel Dance-Holland, English portrait painter and politician (born 1735)
December 22 – François Devosge, French portrait painter (born 1732)
date unknown – George Keith Ralph, British portrait painter (born 1752)

References

 
Years of the 19th century in art
1810s in art